Valentine Monnier (born 22 October 1956, in Paris) is a French actress, model, and photographer. She appeared on the September 1977 cover of Cosmopolitan magazine, and on the cover art of the album Chic, also in 1977. Monnier had an acting career in the 1980s : she played supporting roles in several French productions and had starring roles in two Italian B-movies. In the mid-1980s, she left acting to work primarily as a photographer. In a November 2019 interview, she accused film director Roman Polanski of violently raping her in Switzerland in 1975 when she was 18.

Filmography
 1980 : Le Bar du téléphone : Maria
 1981 : Le Mari, la Femme et le Cosmos (TV movie) : Paule
 1981 : L'Œil de la nuit (TV series), episode : Le syndrome de Cendrillon : Sybille
 1982 : Les Enquêtes du commissaire Maigret de Jean-Paul Sassy (TV series), episode : Le Voleur de Maigret : Sophie
 1982 : Elle voit des nains partout ! : Amélys
 1983 : 2019, After the Fall of New York (2019 - Dopo la caduta di New York) : Giara
 1984 : Monster Shark (Shark rosso nell'oceano) : Dr. Stella Dickens
 1985 : Le Soleil des autres (TV movie) : Terry
 1985 : Trois hommes et un couffin (remade in the US as Three Men and a Baby): Charlotte
 1985 : L'Homme aux yeux d'argent : wounded woman

References

External links
 

Living people
1956 births
Actresses from Paris
French film actresses
French television actresses
20th-century French actresses
French photographers